The Pelagiellida are a group of Cambrian molluscs superficially assigned to the (polyphyletic) Monoplacophora, although their true taxonomic affinities within the Mollusca are unknown.

References

Prehistoric monoplacophorans
Cambrian molluscs
Prehistoric mollusc orders